#ShawnsFirstHeadlines is the debut concert tour by Canadian recording artist, Shawn Mendes. The tour supports the singer's EP, The Shawn Mendes EP (2014),  and his debut studio album, Handwritten (2015). The tour visited North America and Europe.

Opening acts
Jacquie Lee (North America, select dates)
Scott Helman (Toronto)
Astrid S

Setlist
The following setlist was obtained from the concert held on June 9, 2015, at the Hampton Beach Casino Ballroom in Hampton Beach, New Hampshire. It does not represent all concerts for the duration of the tour. 
"Something Big"
"Show You"
"Strings"
"I Don't Even Know Your Name"
"Stitches"
"Fallin'" (Alicia Keys cover)
"Aftertaste"
"Never Be Alone"
"Hey There Delilah" (Plain White T's cover)
"Bring It Back"
"Thinking Out Loud" (Ed Sheeran cover)
"A Little Too Much"
"Kid in Love"
"The Weight"
"Life of the Party"

Tour dates

Festivals and other miscellaneous performances
This concert was a part of "Radio Disney's Family Birthday"
This concert was a part of the "Jingle Ball"
This concert was a part of the "All-Star Concerts"
This concert was a part of the "25th Anniversary Concert Series"
This concert was a part of the "Show of the Summer"
This concert was a part of the "Six Flags Summer Concert Series"
This concert was a part of "Queen City Ex"

Box office score data

References

2014 concert tours
2015 concert tours
Shawn Mendes concert tours